The biophilia hypothesis (also called BET) suggests that humans possess an innate tendency to seek connections with nature and other forms of life. Edward O. Wilson  introduced and popularized the hypothesis in his book, Biophilia (1984). He defines biophilia as "the urge to affiliate with other forms of life".

Natural affinity for living systems 
"Biophilia" is an innate affinity of life or living systems. The term was first used by Erich Fromm to describe a psychological orientation of being attracted to all that is alive and vital. Wilson uses the term in a related sense when he suggests that biophilia describes "the connections that human beings subconsciously seek with the rest of life." He proposed the possibility that the deep affiliations humans have with other life forms and nature as a whole are rooted in our biology. Both positive and negative (including phobic) affiliations toward natural objects (species, phenomenon) as compared to artificial objects are evidence for biophilia.

Although named by Fromm, the concept of biophilia has been proposed and defined many times over. Aristotle was one of many to put forward a concept that could be summarized as "love of life". Diving into the term philia, or friendship, Aristotle evokes the idea of reciprocity and how friendships are beneficial to both parties in more than just one way, but especially in the way of happiness.

The hypothesis has since been developed as part of theories of evolutionary psychology. Taking on an evolutionary perspective people are drawn towards life and nature can be explained in part due to our evolutionary history of residing in natural environments, only recently in our history have we shifted towards an urbanized lifestyle. These connections to nature can still be seen in people today as people gravitate towards, identify with, and desire to connect with nature. These connections are not limited to any one component part of nature, in general people show connections to a wide range of natural things including plants, animals, and environmental landscapes. One possible explanation is that our ancestors who had stronger connections to nature would hold an evolutionary advantage over less connected people as they would have better knowledge and therefor access to food, water, and shelter. In a broader and more general sense research has suggested that our modern urban environments are not suited for minds that evolved in natural environments.

Human preferences toward things in nature, while refined through experience and culture, are hypothetically the product of biological evolution. For example, adult mammals (especially humans) are generally attracted to baby mammal faces and find them appealing across species. The large eyes and small features of any young mammal face are far more appealing than those of the mature adults. Similarly, the hypothesis helps explain why ordinary people care for and sometimes risk their lives to save domestic and wild animals, and keep plants and flowers in and around their homes. In the book Children and Nature: Psychological, Sociocultural, and Evolutionary Investigations edited by Peter Kahn and Stephen Kellert, the importance of animals, especially those with which a child can develop a nurturing relationship, is emphasized particularly for early and middle childhood. Chapter 7 of the same book reports on the help that animals can provide to children with autistic-spectrum disorders.

Biophilic design 
In architecture, biophilic design is a sustainable design strategy that incorporates reconnecting people with the natural environment. It may be seen as a necessary complement to green architecture, which decreases the environmental impact of the built world but does not address human reconnection with the natural world.
Caperna and Serafini define biophilic design as that kind of architecture, which is able to supply our inborn need of connection to life and to the vital processes. Biophilic space has been defined as the environment that strengthens life and supports the sociological and psychological components. These spaces can have positive health effects on people including reducing mental health issues in stressful spaces such as prisons, reducing chronic pain, improving memory, and lowering blood pressure. Examples of this being studied in medical settings include having a window looking out to see living plants is also shown to help speed up the healing process of patients in hospitals. Similarly, having plants in the same room as patients in hospitals also speeds up their healing process.

Biophilia and conservation 
Because of our technological advancements and more time spent inside buildings and cars disconnects us from nature, biophilic activities and time spent in nature may be strengthening our connections as humans to nature, so people continue to have strong urges to reconnect with nature. 
The concern for a lack of connection with the rest of nature outside of us, is that a stronger disregard for other plants, animals and less appealing wild areas could lead to further ecosystem degradation and species loss. Therefore, reestablishing a connection with nature has become more important in the field of conservation. Examples would be more available green spaces in and around cities, more classes that revolve around nature and implementing smart design for greener cities that integrate ecosystems into them such as biophilic cities. These cities can also become part of wildlife corridors to help with migrational and territorial needs of other animals.

Biophilia in fiction
Canadian author Hilary Scharper explicitly adapted E.O. Wilson's  concept of biophilia for her ecogothic novel, Perdita. In the novel, Perdita (meaning "the lost one") is a mythological figure who brings biophilia to humanity.

Biophilia and technology
American philosopher Francis Sanzaro has put forth the claim that because of advances in technological connectivity, especially the internet of things (IOT), our world is becoming increasingly driven by the biophilia hypothesis, namely, the desire to connect to forms of life. Sanzaro applies Wilson's theories to trends in artificial intelligence and psychoanalysis and argues that technology is not an antithesis to nature, but simply another form of seeking intimacy with nature.

See also 

 biocultural evolution
 biomimetics
 deep ecology
 ecopsychology
 environmental psychology
 healthy building
 nature deficit disorder
 ecosexuality

References

External links

 Edward O. Wilson's Biophilia Hypothesis
 Biophilia, biomimicry, and sustainable design
 The Economics of Biophilia - Terrapin Bright Green
 Biophilia, website for Biophilia magazine
"Biophilic Design Patterns: Emerging Nature-Based Parameters for Health and Well-Being in the Built Environment" by Catherine O. Ryan, William D Browning, Joseph O Clancy, Scott L Andrews, Namita B Kallianpurkar (ArchNet-International Journal of Architectural Research)
 14 Patterns of Biophilic Design - Terrapin Bright Green
 "Biophilia: Does Visual Contact with Nature Impact on Health and Well-Being?" - National Center for Biotechnology Information
 "Biophilic Architecture and Biophilic Design" by Antonio Caperna, International Society of Biourbanism
 "Biourbanism for a healthy city: biophilia and sustainable urban theories and practices" by Antonio Caperna and Eleni Tracada, University of Derby (UK) - UDORA Repository
 "Introduction to Biophilic Biophilic Design" by Antonio Caperna, International Society of Biourbanism
 "Biophilic Design", Journal of Biourbanism Volume VI (1&2/2017) by Antonio Caperna Editor in Chief, International Society of Biourbanism

 
Environmental conservation
Environmental psychology
Evolutionary psychology
Hypotheses
Biological hypotheses